The Klamputis is a river of  Kėdainiai district municipality, Kaunas County, central Lithuania. It originates in Varėnai village, on the edge of Kėdainiai and flows for  till the confluence with the Smilga (from the right side) in Bartkūniškiai.

Two little ponds are on the lower flow of the Klamputis. The river passes through Varėnai, Tubiai and Bartkūniškiai villages.

The name Klamputis comes from Lithuanian klampus ('slimy, sloughy').

Images

References

Rivers of Lithuania
Kėdainiai District Municipality